This article lists various football records in relation to the England national football team.

Individual records

Player records

Appearances
 Most appearances 
 Peter Shilton, 125, 25 November 1970 – 7 July 1990
 Wayne Rooney, 120, 12 February 2003 – 15 November 2018
 David Beckham, 115, 1 September 1996 – 14 October 2009
 Steven Gerrard, 114, 31 May 2000 – 24 June 2014
 Bobby Moore, 108, 20 May 1962 – 14 November 1973
 Ashley Cole, 107, 28 March 2001 – 5 March 2014
 Bobby Charlton, 106, 19 April 1958 – 14 June 1970
 Frank Lampard, 106, 10 October 1999 – 24 June 2014
 Billy Wright, 105, 28 September 1946 – 28 May 1959
 First player to reach 100 appearances 
 Billy Wright, 11 April 1959, 1–0 vs. Scotland 
 Fastest to reach 100 appearances 
 Bobby Moore, 10 years 271 days, 20 May 1962 – 14 February 1973
 Most consecutive appearances
 Billy Wright, 70, 3 October 1951 – 28 May 1959
 Most appearances as a substitute 
 Jermain Defoe, 35, 31 March 2004 – 22 June 2017
 Most consecutive appearances as a substitute 
 Owen Hargreaves, 14, 1 June 2004 – 10 June 2006
 Most appearances as a substitute without ever starting a game
 Carlton Cole, 7, 11 January 2009 – 3 March 2010 
 Most appearances in competitive matches (World Cup, European Championship and qualifiers)
 Wayne Rooney, 74, 29 March 2003 – 11 November 2016
 Longest England career 
 Stanley Matthews, 22 years 228 days, 29 September 1934 – 15 May 1957
 Shortest England career
 Nathaniel Chalobah, <1 minute, 15 October 2018, 3–2 vs. Spain
 Martin Kelly, 2 minutes, 26 May 2012, 1–0 vs. Norway
 Most consecutive appearances comprising entire England career
 Roger Byrne, 33, 3 April 1954 – 27 November 1957
 Youngest player 
 Theo Walcott, 17 years 75 days, 30 May 2006, 3–1 vs. Hungary
 Oldest player
 Stanley Matthews, 42 years 103 days, 15 May 1957, 4–1 vs. Denmark
 Oldest debutant
 Alexander Morten, 41 years 113 days, 8 March 1873, 4–2 vs. Scotland 
 Oldest outfield debutant
 Leslie Compton, 38 years 64 days, 15 November 1950, 4–2 vs. Wales 
 Most appearances at the World Cup finals
 Peter Shilton, 17, 16 June 1982 – 7 July 1990
 Most appearances without ever playing at the World Cup finals 
 Dave Watson, 65, 3 April 1974 – 2 June 1982
 Appearances at three World Cup final tournaments
 Tom Finney and Billy Wright, 1950, 1954 and 1958
 Bobby Charlton and Bobby Moore, 1962, 1966 and 1970
 Terry Butcher, Bryan Robson and Peter Shilton, 1982, 1986 and 1990
 David Beckham, Michael Owen and Sol Campbell, 1998, 2002 and 2006
 Ashley Cole, 2002, 2006 and 2010
 Steven Gerrard, Frank Lampard and Wayne Rooney, 2006, 2010 and 2014
 Jordan Henderson and Raheem Sterling, 2014, 2018 and 2022
 Most non-playing selections for the World Cup finals
 George Eastham and Alan Hodgkinson, 2, 1958 and 1962 
 Viv Anderson, 2, 1982 and 1986
 Chris Woods, 2, 1986 and 1990
 Martin Keown and Nigel Martyn, 2, 1998 and 2002
 David James, 2, 2002 and 2006
 Oldest player to feature at the World Cup finals
 Peter Shilton, 40 years, 292 days, 7 July 1990, 1–2 vs. Italy
 Oldest outfield player to feature at the World Cup finals
 Stanley Matthews, 39 years, 145 days, 26 June 1954, 2–4 vs. Uruguay
 Youngest player to feature at the World Cup finals
 Michael Owen, 18 years, 183 days, 15 June 1998, 2–0 vs. Tunisia
 Oldest player to feature in a World Cup qualifying match
 Stanley Matthews, 42 years, 103 days, 5 May 1957, 4–1 vs. Denmark
 Youngest player to feature in a World Cup qualifying match
 Wayne Rooney, 18 years, 351 days, 9 October 2004, 2–0 vs. Wales
 First player to debut at the World Cup finals
 Laurie Hughes, 25 June 1950, 2–0 vs. Chile
 Last player to debut at the World Cup finals
 Allan Clarke, 7 June 1970, 1–0 vs. Czechoslovakia
 Most appearances at the European Championship finals
 Gary Neville, 11, 8 June 1996 – 24 June 2004
 Harry Kane, 11, 11 June 2016 – 11 July 2021
 Most appearances without ever playing at the European Championship finals
 Rio Ferdinand, 81, 15 November 1997 – 4 June 2011
 Appearances at three European Championship final tournaments
 Tony Adams, 1988, 1996 and 2000
 Alan Shearer, 1992, 1996 and 2000
 Sol Campbell and Gary Neville, 1996, 2000 and 2004
 Steven Gerrard, 2000, 2004 and 2012
 Wayne Rooney, 2004, 2012 and 2016
 Jordan Henderson, 2012, 2016 and 2020
 Most non-playing selections for the European Championship finals
 Tony Dorigo, 2, 1988 and 1992
 Ian Walker, 2, 1996 and 2004
 Oldest player to feature at the European Championship finals 
 Peter Shilton, 38 years, 271 days, 15 June 1988, 1–3 vs. Netherlands
 Oldest outfield player to feature at the European Championship finals 
 Stuart Pearce, 34 years, 63 days, 26 June 1996, 1–1 vs. Germany
 Youngest player to feature at the European Championship finals  Jude Bellingham, 17 years, 349 days, 13 June 2021, 1–0 vs. Croatia
 Oldest player to feature in a European Championship qualifying match 
 David Seaman, 39 years, 27 days, 16 October 2002, 2–2 vs. Macedonia
 Oldest outfield player to feature in a European Championship qualifying match 
 Stuart Pearce, 37 years, 137 days, 8 September 1999, 0–0 vs. Poland
 Youngest player to feature in a European Championship qualifying match 
 Wayne Rooney, 17 years, 156 days, 29 March 2003, 2–0 vs. Liechtenstein
 Only player to debut at the European Championship finals
 Tommy Wright, 8 June 1968, 0–1 vs. Yugoslavia
 Most appearances on aggregate at the World Cup and European Championship finals
 Ashley Cole, 22, 2 June 2002 – 24 June 2012
 Most appearances without ever playing at the World Cup finals or the European Championship finals 
 Emlyn Hughes, 62, 5 November 1969 – 24 May 1980
 Fewest appearances in total, having played at both the World Cup finals and European Championship finals 
 Tommy Wright, 11, 8 June 1968 – 7 June 1970
 Most appearances without ever being in a World Cup or European Championship finals squad 
 Mick Channon, 46, 11 October 1972 – 7 September 1977
 Most appearances without featuring in a competitive match
 George Eastham, 19, 8 May 1963 – 3 July 1966
 Most Home International (British Championship) appearances
 Billy Wright, 38, 28 September 1946 – 11 April 1959 
 Most appearances without ever playing on a losing team
 David Rocastle, 14, 14 September 1988 – 17 May 1992
 Most appearances without ever playing on a winning team
 Tommy Banks, 6, 18 May 1958 – 4 October 1958
 Most appearances against a single opponent 
 Billy Wright, 13 vs. Ireland/Northern Ireland, 28 September 1946 – 4 October 1958 and vs. Scotland, 12 April 1947 – 11 April 1959
 Most appearances against a single non-British opponent 
 Alan Ball, 8 vs. West Germany, 12 May 1965 – 12 March 1975
 Most appearances at the old Wembley
 Peter Shilton, 52, 25 November 1970 – 22 May 1990
 Most appearances at the new Wembley
 Joe Hart, 37, 24 May 2010 – 14 November 2017
 Most appearances at a single non-English ground
 Billy Wright, 7, Windsor Park, Belfast, 28 September 1946 – 4 October 1958
 Most appearances at a single non-British ground
 Glenn Hoddle and Kenny Sansom, 5, Azteca Stadium, Mexico City, 6 June 1985 – 22 June 1986
 Most consecutive years of appearances
 David Seaman, 15, 1988 to 2002 inclusive
 Rio Ferdinand, 15, 1997 to 2011 inclusive
 Most appearances in a single calendar year
 Jack Charlton, 16, 1966
 Harry Kane, 16, 2021
 Longest gap between appearances 
 Ian Callaghan, 11 years 49 days, 20 July 1966, 2–0 vs. France – 7 September 1977, 0–0 vs. Switzerland
 Most tournaments appeared in consecutively
 Sol Campbell, 6, 1996 European Championships – 2006 World Cup
 Wayne Rooney, 6, 2004 European Championships – 2016 European Championships
 Jordan Henderson, 6, 2012 European Championships – 2022 World Cup
 Appearances in three separate decades
 Sam Hardy and Jesse Pennington, 1900s, 1910s, 1920s
 Stanley Matthews, 1930s, 1940s, 1950s
 Bobby Charlton, 1950s, 1960s, 1970s
 Emlyn Hughes, 1960s, 1970s, 1980s
 Peter Shilton, 1970s, 1980s, 1990s
 Tony Adams and David Seaman, 1980s, 1990s, 2000s
 Wes Brown, Jamie Carragher, Rio Ferdinand, Emile Heskey, David James and  Frank Lampard, 1990s, 2000s, 2010s
 Only player to make World Cup or European Championship finals appearances in three separate decades
 Tony Adams, 1988 European Championships; 1996 European Championships and 1998 World Cup; 2000 European Championships
 Most appearances in the same team
 Ashley Cole and Steven Gerrard, 76, 2001 – 2014
 Most appearances by a set of brothers 
 Gary and Phil Neville, 144, 1995 – 2007
 Most consecutive appearances by an unchanged team
 6, 23 July 1966 – 16 November 1966
 Appearances under the most managers
 Gareth Barry, 8, 31 May 2000 – 26 May 2012
 First appearance by a player who had never played for an English club
 Joe Baker, of Hibernian, 18 November 1959, 2–1 vs. Northern Ireland
 First player to debut as a substitute 
 Norman Hunter, 8 December 1965, 2–0 vs. Spain
 Last appearance by a player from outside the top division of a country 
 Sam Johnstone,   October 2021, 5–0 vs. Andorra
 Most appearances by a player from outside the top division of a country
 Johnny Haynes, 32, 2 October 1954 – 28 May 1959
 Most appearances by a player from outside the top two divisions
 Reg Matthews, 5, 14 April 1956 – 6 October 1956
 Most appearances by a player from outside the English League system
 David Beckham, 55, 20 August 2003 – 14 October 2009
 Capped by another country
 John Hawley Edwards and Robert Evans (Wales)
 Jack Reynolds (Ireland)
 Gordon Hodgson (South Africa)
 Ken Armstrong (New Zealand)
 Jackie Sewell (Zambia)
 Wilfried Zaha (Ivory Coast)
 Declan Rice (Republic of Ireland)
 Steven Caulker (Sierra Leone)
 Club providing the most England internationals in total
 Tottenham Hotspur, 78
 Non-English club providing the most England internationals in total
 Rangers, 7
 Most appearances per English club

 Most appearances with non-English clubs

 England starting XI based on appearances

Goals
 First goal 
 William Kenyon-Slaney, 8 March 1873, 4–2 vs. Scotland
 Most goals
 Wayne Rooney, 53,  6 September 2003 – 27 June 2016
 Harry Kane, 53, 27 March 2015 – 10 December 2022
 Most goals in competitive matches (World Cup, European Championship, Nations League and qualifiers)
 Harry Kane, 47, 27 March 2015 – 10 December 2022
 Most goals in a match
 Howard Vaughton, Steve Bloomer, Willie Hall and Malcolm Macdonald, all five
 Four goals or more in a match on the greatest number of occasions
 Steve Bloomer, Vivian Woodward, Tommy Lawton, Jimmy Greaves and Gary Lineker, twice each
 Three goals or more in a match on the greatest number of occasions
 Jimmy Greaves, six times
 Scoring in most consecutive internationals
 Tinsley Lindley, 6, 5 February 1887 – 7 April 1888
 Jimmy Windridge, 6, 16 March – 13 June 1908
 Tommy Lawton, 6, 22 October 1938 – 13 May 1939
 Harry Kane, 6, 7 September – 17 November 2019
 Scoring in most consecutive appearances
 Steve Bloomer, 10, 9 March 1895 – 20 March 1899
 Most appearances, scoring in every match
 George Camsell, 9, 9 May 1929 – 9 May 1936
 Most goals on debut
 Howard Vaughton, 5, 18 February 1882, 13–0 vs. Ireland
 Most goals in a World Cup tournament 
 Gary Lineker, 6, 1986 World Cup
 Harry Kane, 6, 2018 World Cup
 Most goals in total at World Cup tournaments 
 Gary Lineker, 10, 11 June 1986 – 4 July 1990
 Most goals in a World Cup qualifying campaign 
 Harry Kane, 12, 2022 World Cup qualifying
 Most goals in a World Cup finals match
 Geoff Hurst, 3, 30 July 1966, 4–2 vs. West Germany
 Gary Lineker, 3, 11 June 1986, 3–0 vs. Poland
 Harry Kane, 3, 24 June 2018, 6–1 vs. Panama
 Most goals in a World Cup qualifying match 
 Jack Rowley, 4, 15 October 1949, 9–2 vs. Northern Ireland
 David Platt, 4, 17 February 1993, 6–0 vs. San Marino
 Ian Wright, 4, 17 November 1993, 7–1 vs. San Marino
 Harry Kane, 4, 15 November 2021, 10–0 vs. San Marino
 First goal in a World Cup finals match 
 Stan Mortensen, 25 June 1950, 2–0 vs. Chile
 First goal in a World Cup qualifying campaign  Stan Mortensen, 15 October 1949, 4–1 vs. Wales
 Oldest goalscorer at the World Cup finals 
 Tom Finney, 36 years, 64 days, 8 June 1958, 2–2 vs. Soviet Union
 Youngest goalscorer at the World Cup finals 
 Michael Owen, 18 years, 190 days, 22 June 1998, 1–2 vs. Romania
 Oldest goalscorer in a World Cup qualifying match 
 Teddy Sheringham, 35 years, 187 days, 6 October 2001, 2–2 vs. Greece
 Youngest goalscorer in a World Cup qualifying match 
 Alex Oxlade-Chamberlain, 19 years, 58 days, 12 October 2012, 5–0 vs. San Marino
 Most goals in a European Championship tournament 
 Alan Shearer, 5, 1996 European Championship
 Most goals in total at European Championship tournaments 
 Alan Shearer, 7, 8 June 1996 – 20 June 2000
 Most goals in a European Championship qualifying campaign 
 Harry Kane, 12, 2020 European Championship qualifying 
 Most goals in a European Championship finals match 
 Alan Shearer, 2, 18 June 1996, 4–1 vs. Netherlands
 Teddy Sheringham, 2, 18 June 1996, 4–1 vs. Netherlands
 Wayne Rooney, 2, 17 June 2004, 3–0 vs. Switzerland and 21 June 2004, 4–2 vs. Croatia
 Harry Kane, 2, 3 July 2021, 4–0 vs. Ukraine
 Most goals in a European Championship qualifying match 
 Malcolm Macdonald, 5, 16 April 1975, 5–0 vs. Cyprus
 First goal in a European Championship finals match 
 Bobby Charlton, 8 June 1968, 2–0 vs. Soviet Union
 First goal in a European Championship qualifying campaign 
 Ron Flowers, 3 October 1962, 1–1 vs. France
 Oldest goalscorer at the European Championship finals 
 Trevor Brooking, 31 years, 260 days, 18 June 1980, 2–1 vs. Spain
 Youngest goalscorer at the European Championship finals 
 Wayne Rooney, 18 years, 236 days, 17 June 2004, 3–0 vs. Switzerland
 Oldest goalscorer in a European Championship qualifying match 
 David Watson, 33 years, 48 days, 22 November 1979, 2–0 vs. Bulgaria
 Youngest goalscorer in a European Championship qualifying match 
 Wayne Rooney, 17 years, 317 days, 6 September 2003, 2–1 vs. Macedonia
 Most Home International Championship goals 
 Steve Bloomer, 28, 9 March 1895 – 6 April 1907
 Most goals in a calendar year
 Harry Kane, 16, 2021
 Most goals in an English season
 Jimmy Greaves, 13, 1960–61
 Most goals against the same opponent
 Steve Bloomer, 12 vs. Wales, 16 March 1896 – 18 March 1901
 Most goals against the same non-British opponent
 Vivian Woodward, 8 vs. Austria, 6 June 1908 – 1 June 1909
 Most goals scored from penalties
 Harry Kane, 17, 13 June 2017 – 10 December 2022
 Most penalties scored in a match
 Tom Finney, 2, 14 May 1950, 5–2 vs. Portugal
 Geoff Hurst, 2, 13 March 1969, 5–0 vs. France
 Gary Lineker, 2, 1 July 1990, 3–2 vs. Cameroon
 Harry Kane, 2, 24 June 2018, 6–1 vs. Panama, 7 September 2019, 4–0 vs. Bulgaria and 15 November 2021, 10–0 vs. San Marino
 Most goals in penalty shoot-outs
 Michael Owen, David Platt and Alan Shearer, 3
 Most goals scored by a defender 
 Harry Maguire, 7, 7 July 2018 – 15 November 2021
 Oldest goalscorer 
 Stanley Matthews, 41 years, 248 days, 6 October 1956, 1–1 vs. Northern Ireland
 Youngest goalscorer 
 Wayne Rooney, 17 years, 317 days, 6 September 2003, 2–1 vs. Macedonia
 First goal by a substitute 
 Jimmy Mullen, 18 May 1950, 4–1 vs. Belgium
 Fastest goal from kick-off 
 Tommy Lawton, 17 seconds, 25 May 1947, 10–0 vs. Portugal
 Fastest goal at Wembley 
 Bryan Robson, 38 seconds, 13 December 1989, 2–1 vs. Yugoslavia
 Fastest goal at the World Cup finals 
 Bryan Robson, 27 seconds, 16 June 1982, 3–1 vs. France
 Fastest goal at the European Championship finals 
 Luke Shaw, 1 minute, 57 seconds, 11 July 2021, 1-1 vs. Italy, Euro 2020 Final
 Fastest goal by a substitute 
 Teddy Sheringham, 15 seconds, 6 October 2001, 2–2 vs. Greece, 2002 World Cup qualifier
 First player to score a hat-trick 
 Digger Brown or Howard Vaughton, 18 February 1882, 13–0 vs. Ireland
 Oldest player to score a hat-trick 
 Gary Lineker, 30 years, 194 days, 12 June 1991, 4–2 vs. Malaysia
 Youngest player to score a hat-trick 
 Theo Walcott, 19 years, 178 days, 10 September 2008, 4–1 vs. Croatia
 Most appearances for an outfield player without ever scoring 
 Ashley Cole, 107, 28 March 2001 – 5 March 2014
 Most goalscorers in a match
 7, 15 December 1982, 9–0 vs. Luxembourg
 7, 22 March 2013, 8–0 vs. San Marino
 7, 15 November 2021, 10–0 vs. San Marino
 Goals in three separate decades
 Stanley Matthews, 1930s, 1940s, 1950s
 Bobby Charlton, 1950s, 1960s, 1970s
 Most consecutive goalscoring tournaments
 Michael Owen, 4, v Romania and Argentina, 1998 World Cup; v Romania, 2000 European Championships; v Denmark and Brazil, 2002 World Cup; v Portugal, 2004 European Championships
 Longest wait between goals
 Tony Adams, 11 years 196 days, 16 November 1988, 1–1 vs. Saudi Arabia – 31 May 2000, 2–0 vs. Ukraine
 Last England goalscorer at the old Wembley
 Tony Adams, 31 May 2000, 2–0 vs. Ukraine
 First England goalscorer at the new Wembley
 John Terry, 1 June 2007, 1–1 vs. Brazil
 Highest goals to games average
 George Camsell, 18 goals in 9 games, average 2.0 goals per game.
 Most goals by a player from outside the top division of a country
 Vivian Woodward, 29, 14 February 1903 – 3 March 1911
 Most goals by a player from outside the top two divisions
 Tommy Lawton, Joe Payne and Peter Taylor, all 2
 Most goals by a player from outside the English League system
 David Platt, 19, 17 May 1992 – 8 June 1995
 Most goals per English club

 Most goals with non-English clubs

Captains
 First captain 
 Cuthbert Ottaway, 30 November 1872, 0–0 vs. Scotland
 Most appearances as captain 
 Billy Wright and Bobby Moore, both 90
 Youngest captain 
 Bobby Moore, 22 years 47 days, 29 May 1963, 4–2 vs. Czechoslovakia
 Oldest captain
 Alexander Morten, 41 years 113 days, 8 March 1873, 4–2 vs. Scotland

Discipline
 Most yellow cards 
 David Beckham, 19
 Most red cards 
 David Beckham and Wayne Rooney, 2 each
 List of all England players sent off

Manager records

Team records 
 Biggest victory
 13–0 vs. Ireland, 18 February 1882
 Heaviest defeat 
 1–7 vs. Hungary, 23 May 1954
 Biggest home victory 
 13–2 vs. Ireland, 18 February 1899
 Heaviest home defeat 
 1–6 vs. Scotland, 12 March 1881
 Biggest victory at the World Cup finals 
 6–1 vs. Panama, 24 June 2018
 Heaviest defeat at the World Cup finals 
 1–4 vs. Germany, 27 June 2010
 Biggest victory at the European Championship finals 
 4–0 vs. Ukraine, 3 July 2021
 Heaviest defeat at the European Championship finals 
 1–3 vs. Netherlands, 15 June 1988
 1–3 vs. Soviet Union, 18 June 1988
 Biggest victory in a competitive international (World Cup, European Championship, Nations League and qualifiers)
 10–0 vs. San Marino, 15 November 2021
 Heaviest defeat in a competitive international (World Cup, European Championship, Nations League and qualifiers)
 0–4 vs. Hungary, 14 June 2022
 First defeat to a non-British team
 3–4 vs. Spain, 15 May 1929
 First defeat to a non-British team on home soil
 0–2 vs. Republic of Ireland, 21 September 1949
 First defeat to a non-European team
 0–1 vs. United States, 29 June 1950
 Most consecutive victories
 10, 6 June 1908 vs. Austria – 1 June 1909 vs. Austria
 Most consecutive victories in competitive internationals (World Cup, European Championship and qualifiers)
 10, 7 September 2014 vs. Switzerland – 12 October 2015 vs. Lithuania
 Most consecutive matches without defeat
 22, 18 November 2020 vs. Iceland – 29 March 2022 vs. Ivory Coast
 Most consecutive defeats  3, Achieved on seven occasions, most recently 11 July 2018 vs. Croatia – 8 September 2018 vs. Spain
 Most consecutive matches without victory 
 7, 11 May 1958 vs. Yugoslavia – 4 October 1958 vs. Northern Ireland
 Most consecutive draws 
 4, Achieved on three occasions, most recently 7 June 1989 vs. Denmark – 15 November 1989 vs. Italy
 Most consecutive matches without a draw
 21, 16 May 1936 vs. Austria – 15 April 1939 vs. Scotland
 Most consecutive matches scoring
 52, 17 March 1884 vs. Wales – 30 March 1901 vs. Scotland
 Most consecutive matches without scoring 
 4, 29 April 1981 vs. Romania – 23 May 1981 vs. Scotland
 Most consecutive matches conceding a goal 
 13, 6 May 1959 vs. Italy – 8 October 1960 vs. Northern Ireland
 Most consecutive matches without conceding a goal
 7, 2 June 2021 vs. Austria – 3 July 2021 vs. Ukraine

Miscellaneous
 First substitute 
 Jimmy Mullen (for Jackie Milburn), 18 May 1950, 4–1 vs. Belgium
 Players appearing both before and after World War II 
 Raich Carter, Tommy Lawton, Stanley Matthews
 Club providing the most players in a single match 
 Starting XI – Arsenal, 7,  14 November 1934 vs. Italy
 Including substitutes – Manchester United, 7,  28 March 2001 vs. Albania
 Major tournament – Liverpool, 6,  19 June 2014 vs. Uruguay
 Club providing the most players in a major tournament squad
 Liverpool, 6, 1980 European Championships, 2012 European Championships, 2014 World Cup
 Last amateur to appear 
 Bernard Joy, 9 May 1936, 2–3 vs. Belgium
 Most consecutive clean sheets 
 Gordon Banks, 7, 26 June 1966 – 23 July 1966
 Jordan Pickford, 7, 18 November 2020 – 3 July 2021
 Most penalty saves
 Ron Springett, 2, from Jimmy McIlroy of Northern Ireland, 18 November 1959 and from Oscar Montalvo of Peru, 20 May 1962 
 Most penalty saves in shoot outs 
 Jordan Pickford, 4, from Carlos Bacca of Colombia, 3 July 2018; Josip Drmić of Switzerland, 9 June 2019; Andrea Belotti and Jorginho of Italy, 11 July 2021
 Most penalty misses
 Harry Kane, 4
 Father and son both capped 
 George Eastham, Sr. (1 cap, 1935) and George Eastham (19 caps, 1963–1966)
 Brian Clough (2 caps, 1959) and Nigel Clough (14 caps, 1989–1993)
 Frank Lampard Sr. (2 caps, 1972–1980) and Frank Lampard (106 caps, 1999–2014)
 Ian Wright (33 caps, 1991–1998) and Shaun Wright-Phillips (36 caps, 2004–2010)
 Mark Chamberlain (8 caps, 1982–1984) and Alex Oxlade-Chamberlain (35 caps, 2012–)
 Grandfather and grandson both capped
 Bill Jones, (2 caps, 1950) and Rob Jones (8 caps, 1992–1995)

 Great great- grandfather and great great-grandson both capped
 Billy Garraty, (1 cap, 1903) and Jack Grealish, (24 caps, 2020–)
 Most clubs represented by one player in an England career 
 Peter Shilton, 5, Leicester City, Stoke City, Nottingham Forest, Southampton and Derby County, 25 November 1970 – 7 July 1990
 Dave Watson, 5, Sunderland, Manchester City, Werder Bremen, Southampton and Stoke City, 3 April 1974 – 2 June 1982
 David Platt, 5, Aston Villa, Bari, Juventus, Sampdoria and Arsenal, 15 November 1989 – 26 June 1996
 David James, 5, Liverpool, Aston Villa, West Ham United, Manchester City and Portsmouth, 29 March 1997 – 27 June 2010
 Emile Heskey, 5, Leicester City, Liverpool, Birmingham City, Wigan Athletic and Aston Villa, 28 April 1999 – 27 June 2010 
 Scott Parker, 5, Charlton Athletic, Chelsea, Newcastle United, West Ham United and Tottenham Hotspur, 16 November 2003 – 22 March 2013
 England players who later became manager/head coach 
 Alf Ramsey, 32 appearances as a player, 1948–1953, 113 matches as manager, 1963–1974
 Joe Mercer, 5 appearances as a player, 1938–1939, 7 matches as manager, 1974 
 Don Revie, 6 appearances as a player, 1954–1956, 29 matches as manager, 1974–1977
 Bobby Robson, 20 appearances as a player, 1957–1962, 95 matches as manager, 1982–1990
 Terry Venables, 2 appearances as a player, 1964, 23 matches as head coach, 1994–1996
 Glenn Hoddle, 53 appearances as a player, 1979–1988, 28 matches as manager, 1996–1999
 Kevin Keegan, 63 appearances as a player, 1972–1982, 18 matches as manager, 1999–2000
 Peter Taylor, 4 appearances as a player, 1976, 1 match as manager, 2000
 Stuart Pearce, 78 appearances as a player, 1987–1999, 1 match as manager, 2012
 Gareth Southgate, 57 appearances as a player, 1995–2004, 81 matches as manager, 2016–

References

Notes

General references

 
Association football in England lists
National association football team records and statistics
British records